Dan Petro is the loa who protects farmers in Vodou. He is the father of Ti Jean Petro.

References

Tutelary deities
Voodoo gods